Charissa ambiguata is a species of moth, belonging to the genus Charissa.

It is native to Eurasia.

References

External links

Gnophini